The Shanghai Cooperation Organisation Interbank Consortium (abbreviated as SCO IBC) is a platform for joint financing of development projects by members and other participants of the Shanghai Cooperation Organisation.

History
The SCO Interbank Consortium was created in October 2005 during the 2005 SCO Summit. The consortium was among several economic integration projects announced during the summit. The first meeting of the SCO Interbank Association was held in Beijing on 21–22 February 2006.

Banks

Member banks
Development Bank of Kazakhstan
RSK Bank (Kyrgyzstan)
China Development Bank
VEB.RF (Russia)
Amonatbonk State Savings Bank (Tajikistan)
National Bank of the Republic of Uzbekistan for Foreign Economic Activity
Habib Bank Limited (Pakistan)
India Infrastructure Finance Company

Observers
Eurasian Development Bank
Belarusbank
Development Bank of Mongolia

Belt and Road Initiative
China has sought to use the platform to push for more cooperation under its Belt and Road Initiative. China Development Bank, one of the two main policy banks supporting the Belt and Road Initiative, had by the end of 2017 loaned $7.69 billion and 3.34 billion yuan to member banks of the SCO Interbank Consortium. The outstanding loans at the time stood at $2.05 billion dollars and 3.3 billion yuan. At the 2018 SCO summit in Qingdao, China's paramount leader Xi Jinping pledged to set up a 30 billion yuan ($4.69 billion) for a special lending facility within the framework of the SCO Interbank Consortium. The capital would be put to use for cross-border transportation projects and industrial parks.

SCO Development Bank
The SCO Development Bank is a proposed multilateral financial institution. Since 2010, China has sought to expand financial cooperation under the auspices of the Shanghai Cooperation Organisation by setting up the bank. Russia however has shown skepticism to the bank and in general has prioritized security cooperation within the SCO rather than economic projects. Russia has alternatively suggested to China to buy a stake in the Russian led Eurasian Development Bank. The Asian Infrastructure Investment Bank was established in 2015 and has substituted the proposed role of the SCO Development Bank to fund infrastructure projects in the region.

Despite the delays, there still remains support among member states for creating the bank. Pakistani Prime Minister Khan at the 2019 SCO Summit called for the bank and an SCO development fund to be expeditiously created.

References

International finance institutions
International banking institutions